Godlewski's bunting (Emberiza godlewskii) is a species of bird in the family Emberizidae. It is named after the Polish collector Victor Godlewski who obtained a specimen of which on the basis of which it was described by Taczanowski.

Distribution and habitat 
It is found in China, Pakistan, India, Kazakhstan, Mongolia, Myanmar, and Russia.

Description 
The adult's head, neck, and breast are grey over-all with a brown or black eye stripe, "mustache", and crown.  Its underparts and rump are an orange/buff wash and its back is mottled orange and black.  The tail is black and orange above and white beneath, with a definite notch at the end. It has a sparrow-like beak which is black above and pale below. The legs and feet are light pink.

Habitat 
Its natural habitat is temperate shrubland.

References

Godlewski's bunting
Birds of Asia
Godlewski's bunting
Godlewski's bunting
Taxonomy articles created by Polbot